Quentin Aubague (born 16 June 1989) is a French Paralympic cyclist who competes in international road cycling competitions. He is a nine-time World champion. He has competed at the 2012 and 2016 Summer Paralympics and has reached fourth place in the road race at both Games.

Aubague had a cerebral haemorrhage after he was born and had quadriplegia in all four limbs as a result, his parents were told that he will never walk. When he became a toddler, his parents encouraged him to use a tricycle and Aubague started to pedal without any help. He continued his love for cycling into his teens and he often travelled with his father on a tandem and he later ensued his passion into elite tricycle racing, Aubague began his sporting career at the 2009 UCI Para-cycling Road World Championships in Bogogno, Italy and won his first ever medals, two golds in the road race and time trial T1.

References

External links
 
 

1989 births
Living people
French male cyclists
Paralympic cyclists of France
Cyclists at the 2012 Summer Paralympics
Cyclists at the 2016 Summer Paralympics